Solitary Man Records is a German-Japanese Independent record label with headquarters in Münster, Germany and Tokyo, Japan.
The record label was formed by Ingo Knollmann (singer of the Donots) and Florian Brauch (manager of the Donots) in 2006 in Japan and in 2008 in Germany, too.

Artists 
The following artists/bands already released albums and/or EPs at Solitary Man Records Europe:

 Donots

The following artists/bands already released albums and/or EPs at Solitary Man Records Japan:

 3 Colours Red
 Beatsteaks
 Bombshell Rocks
 Boysetsfire
 Coalfield
 Donots
 Dover
 Dropkick Murphys
 Endstand
 Fabulous Disaster
 Favez
 Force Of Change
 Heideroosjes
 The Lucky Nine
 Monta
 The Movement
 Muff Potter
 Placebo
 Sahara Hotnights
 The Spittin Vicars
 The Toy Dolls

External links 
 Solitary Man Records Website

Companies based in North Rhine-Westphalia
Mass media companies based in Tokyo
German independent record labels
Japanese record labels
Record labels established in 2006